The Trial of the Incredible Hulk is a 1989 American television superhero film based on the 1978–1982 television series The Incredible Hulk featuring both the Hulk and fellow Marvel Comics character Daredevil, who team up to defeat Wilson Fisk. As was the case with The Incredible Hulk Returns, this television movie also acted as a backdoor television pilot for a series, in this case, for Daredevil (which was not produced). It was filmed in Vancouver, British Columbia, Canada. The Trial of the Incredible Hulk was directed by and stars Bill Bixby. Also starring are Lou Ferrigno, Rex Smith and John Rhys-Davies. Despite the film's title, writer/executive producer Gerald Di Pego has stated that the idea of having the Hulk actually go on trial was never even discussed.

Plot
On the run again after the events of the previous TV movie, a disenchanted and overwhelmed David Banner is working up north under the name David Belson. A bully pushes him around and David is tempted to fight him, but, knowing he will just turn into the Hulk again, he walks away.

Later, David makes his way toward a large city with the hopes of renting a room and staying incognito. Unbeknownst to him, the city he arrives in is under the control of a powerful underworld crime boss named Wilson Fisk but is also protected by a mysterious black-clad crimefighter known as Daredevil. When two of Fisk's men come onto the commuter subway train after having committed a jewel robbery, one of them takes an interest in a woman also riding the train, but she rejects him. David witnesses the assault and transforms into the Hulk, which results in the usual disruption and chaos. A short while later, David is arrested by the police and wrongfully charged with the crime.

While awaiting trial, blind defense attorney Matt Murdock is assigned to David's case. David is uncooperative, but Murdock has faith that he is innocent and is determined to prove so.  Meanwhile, Fisk has the victim from the subway, Ellie Mendez, abducted from protective custody. Fisk plans a major meeting of underworld crime bosses in order to propose the consolidation of their operations into a syndicate, with himself as chairman. One night while asleep in jail, David has a nightmare about his upcoming trial and dreams about transforming into the Hulk on the witness stand. The stress of this causes him to transform in reality, and the Hulk breaks out of prison.

Subsequent events see David Banner team up with Daredevil who reveals his identity as Matt Murdock. Matt tells David about his origins which David initially has trouble accepting. Daredevil also reveals that he has an ally on the police force who provides him with information relating to criminal activity. Daredevil goes to investigate a tip provided by his informant, but the tip was planted by Wilson Fisk, using Ellie Mendez as bait in a trap. Daredevil is badly injured in an ambush by Fisk's men before David rushes to save Matt subsequently transforming into the Hulk who saves Matt in time from Fisk and his men, who flee the scene. Matt, barely conscious, traces the Hulk's face as he transforms back to David, thus learning David's secret.

Using his training as a medical doctor, David treats Matt's injuries and spreads a cover story about Matt's injuries being the result of falling down stairs. While Matt's self-confidence is seriously shaken, David's confidence has been restored by seeing how Matt has embraced his unique gifts, which are also caused by exposure to radiation. After a little coaxing from David, Matt begins to recover and retrain his body. Soon enough, the two return to work and go to save Ellie Mendez with assistance from Fisks sympathetic right hand Edgar. The two engage Wilson Fisk and his men and ultimately succeed in besting him, without the Hulk appearing. Fisk and Edgar escape, and Ellie Mendez is freed.

David and Matt part ways as friends. David continues his search of a cure for himself, and Matt remains in the city to protect it.

Cast
Bill Bixby as Dr. David Banner 
Lou Ferrigno as Hulk
Rex Smith as Matt Murdock/Daredevil
John Rhys-Davies as Wilson Fisk
Marta DuBois as Ellie Mendez
Nancy Everhard as Christa Klein
Richard Cummings Jr. as Al Pettiman
Nicholas Hormann as Edgar
Joseph Mascolo as Dep. Chief Albert G. Tendelli 
Linda Darlow as Fake Nurse
John Novak as Denny
Dwight Koss as John
Meredith Bain Woodward as Farm Supervisor
Mark Acheson as Turk Barrett

Production
Filming took place in Vancouver, Canada for a month beginning on February 15, 1989.

Stan Lee's debut cameo appearance
The Trial of the Incredible Hulk began the long history of discreet live-action cameo appearances by Stan Lee, co-creator of the Hulk. He is the jury foreman in the dream sequence. It is not, however, the first cameo appearance by a Marvel creator. Jack Kirby had already made an uncredited cameo appearance in the 1979 Incredible Hulk episode "No Escape".

Reception
Though it did not succeed in giving birth to a Daredevil television series, The Trial of the Incredible Hulk garnered very high ratings.

Viewers were less enthusiastic about it than The Incredible Hulk Returns. The most common criticisms were the absence of the Hulk himself from the final act and the misleading title (the "trial" only takes place in a dream sequence).

In a retrospective review for the Radio Times Guide to Films, film critic Narinder Flora awarded the film two stars out of five, calling it "tame action fare" with "all the hallmarks of an idea that has run out of steam".

Home media
This television film was released on VHS by Starmaker Videos in December 1992. It was re-released by Image Entertainment on October 11, 2011.

References

External links

Television pilots not picked up as a series
Hulk (comics) films
Television series reunion films
Films based on television series
American sequel films
NBC network original films
1980s superhero films
1989 television films
1989 films
Television films as pilots
The Incredible Hulk (1978 TV series)
Films directed by Bill Bixby
Daredevil (Marvel Comics) films
American crime drama films
1980s American films
Live-action films based on Marvel Comics